Eucalyptus oxymitra, commonly known as the sharp-capped mallee, is a species of mallee that is endemic to remote parts of Central Australia. It has rough bark on the trunk, smooth greyish bark above, lance-shaped to egg-shaped adult leaves, flower buds in groups of seven, white to pale yellow flowers and hemispherical fruit.

Description
It has rough, imperfectly shed ribbons of greyish brown bark on the trunk, smooth grey to cream-coloured bark on the branches. Flowering mainly occurs from October to January and the flowers are white to pale yellow.

Taxonomy
Eucalyptus oxymitra was first formally described in 1936 by William Blakely in Transactions and Proceedings of the Royal Society of South Australia. The type material was collected by Ralph Tate in 1894 during the Horn expedition. The specific epithet (oxymitra) is from ancient Greek, meaning "sharp cap", referring to the long, narrow operculum.

Distribution and habitat
Sharp-capped mallee grows in open shrubland in undulating sand and on sand dunes in the central Australian ranges of the far east of Western Australian, south-western Northern Territory and north-western South Australia.

Conservation status
This eucalypt is classified as "not threatened" by the Western Australian Government Department of Parks and Wildlife.

See also
List of Eucalyptus species

References

Eucalypts of Western Australia
Flora of the Northern Territory
Flora of South Australia
oxymitra
Myrtales of Australia
Plants described in 1936
Taxa named by William Blakely